Robert Manners may refer to:
Lord Robert Manners (British Army officer, died 1782) (c. 1721–1782), British general
Lord Robert Manners-Sutton (1722–1762), his nephew
Robert Manners (British Army officer, born 1758) (1758–1823), general and MP for Great Bedwyn and Cambridge
Lord Robert Manners (Royal Navy officer) (1758–1782), killed at the Battle of the Saintes
Lord Robert Manners (British Army officer, born 1781) (1781–1835), British major-general and politician

See also
Duke of Rutland